Jang Ho-ik (born 4 December 1993) is a South Korean professional footballer who plays as a defender for K League 1 side Suwon Samsung Bluewings.

Club career 
Jang joined Suwon Samsung Bluewings in 2016

Career statistics

Clubs

References

External links

Living people
1993 births
Association football defenders
South Korean footballers
Suwon Samsung Bluewings players
Gimcheon Sangmu FC players
K League 1 players